Ole Jørgensen Richter (23 May 1829 – 15 June 1888) was a Norwegian lawyer, politician, parliamentarian and the prime minister of the Norwegian Government in Stockholm.

Early life and education 
Son of Jørgen and Massi Richter, Ole was born and grew up on the farm Rostad in Inderøy, Nord-Trøndelag. The farm was one of the biggest in the community and had belonged to his mother's family for generations. His father belonged to the family Richter which originated in Saxony. His great-grandfather had come to Norway as a specialist in mining. He married a Norwegian farmer daughter and the family was subsequently involved in farming as well as other businesses. Jørgen Richter ran Rostad farm, had a small brickyard and did some fishing and boatbuilding.  He was involved in local politics and had interest in national politics as well. Jørgen Richter  Both parents were religious.

Ole who was number four of eight children was educated at home. Aged 15, he moved in 1845 to an uncle in Orkdal who was a magistrate (Norwegian: sorenskriver) He worked at the office and got some education. In 1846, he went to Christiania to take a preliminary exam at the University of Oslo.  which was students who had not studied Greek or Latin. The preliminary exam gave the opportunity to take a lower degree in law which he did in 1847. Feeling that the lower degree would not provide him with adequate career opportunities, he chose the same year to accept an offer by an uncle in Denmark to come and live in order  to study to an ordinary examen artium. After two years in Denmark, he passed the examen artium at the University of  Oslo in 1849. He subsequently got a cand.jur. degree at the University of Oslo

Political career and death 
Richter was elected to the Storting for the Liberal Party where he became the first Prime Minister in Stockholm after parliamentarianism was introduced, as part of Cabinet Sverdrup in 1884. He was granted royal permission for a family graveyard on his farm Rostad, where he and his family are buried. He committed suicide in 16 June 1888 by shooting himself in his Prime Ministerial office in Stockholm.

References

Sources 

 

Liberal Party (Norway) politicians
Government ministers of Norway
People from Inderøy
Norwegian politicians who committed suicide
1828 births
1888 deaths
Members of the Storting
19th-century Norwegian politicians
1880s suicides